The R704 road is a regional road in Ireland. It travels from Mullinavat, County Kilkenny to New Ross, County Wexford.

References

Regional roads in the Republic of Ireland
Roads in County Kilkenny
Roads in County Wexford